The 2002 Hart Council election took place on 2 May 2002 to elect members of Hart District Council in Hampshire, England. The whole council was up for election with boundary changes since the last election in 2000. The Conservative Party gained overall control of the council from no overall control.

Campaign
The election saw 10 sitting councillors decide not to seek re-election including 3 former chairmen of the council. 6 Conservatives were unopposed in the election in the wards of Crondall, Eversley, Long Sutton and Odiham, while several Independents stood for the council. The independents included Archie Gillespie, a former Liberal Democrat standing as an independent after being deselected, former councillor Stephen Gorys and an "anti roadblock campaigner" Denis Gotel.

During the campaign a Conservative candidate in Hartley Wintney, Andrew Davies, withdrew meaning only one Conservative would be standing in the ward against Independent Susan Band and 2 Liberal Democrats.

Election result
The results saw the Conservatives gain a majority on the council after winning 22 seats on the council. The Liberal Democrats were reduced to only 10 seats concentrated in their strongholds of Yateley and Hawley. Meanwhile, 3 independents were successful in being elected, 2 in Fleet and 1 in Hartley Wintney. Overall turnout in the election was 29.89%.

Ward results

Blackwater and Hawley

Church Crookham East

Church Crookham West

Crondall

Eversley

Fleet Central

Fleet Courtmoor

Fleet North

Fleet Pondtail

Fleet West

Frogmore and Darby Green

Hartley Wintney

Hook

Long Sutton

Odiham

Yateley East

Yateley North

Yateley West

References

2002
2002 English local elections
2000s in Hampshire